Romain Arneodo and Hugo Nys were the defending champions but only Arneodo chose to defend his title, partnering Quentin Halys. Arneodo lost in the quarterfinals to Antoine Hoang and Kyrian Jacquet.

Pierre-Hugues Herbert and Albano Olivetti won the title after defeating Hoang and Jacquet 6–2, 2–6, [11–9] in the final.

Seeds

Draw

References

External links
 Main draw

2021 ATP Challenger Tour
Doubles